The voiced bilabial click is a click consonant found in some of the languages of southern Africa.

Features

Features of the voiced bilabial click:

Occurrence
Voiced bilabial clicks only occur in the Tuu and Kx'a families of southern Africa. These sounds are extremely rare and many non-native speakers find it difficult to pronounce. Thus, these sounds are sometimes transliterated as a "g" and a "G" and are pronounced as Velar and Uvular Plosives.

References

Bilabial consonants
Click consonants
Voiced oral consonants